In orbital mechanics, low-thrust relative transfer is an orbital maneuver in which a chaser spacecraft covers a specific relative distance relative to the target spacecraft using continuous low-thrust system with specific impulse of the order of 4000-8000s. This is in contrast to conventional impulsive transfers in the orbit which uses thermal rocket engines to develop impulse of the order of 300-400s. Such type of transfer uses low-thrust propulsion systems such as electrically powered spacecraft propulsion and solar sail. 

Low-thrust relative transfer uses the orbital relative motion equations which are the non-linear set of equations that describes the motion of the chaser spacecraft relative to the target in terms of displacements along the respective axis of the accelerated frame of reference fixed on the target spacecraft. In 1960, W. H. Clohessy and R. S. Wiltshire published the Clohessy-Wiltshire equations, which presents a rather simplified model of orbital relative motion, in which the target is in a circular orbit, and the chaser spacecraft is in an elliptical or circular orbit. Since, the quantity of available thrust is limited, the transfer is occasionally posed as an optimal control problem subjected to the required objective and constraints.

Explanation 
Relative motion in the orbit means the motion of a spacecraft orbiting a planet relative to the other spacecraft orbiting the same planet. There can be one primary spacecraft known as the target and the other spacecraft with the task of performing the required maneuver relative to the target. Based on the mission requirement, the various relative orbital transfers can be rendezvous and docking operations, and maintaining station relative to the target. Unlike using a thrust-impulse to instantaneously change the velocity of the spacecraft, in non-impulsive transfer, there is a continuous application of thrust, so that, the spacecraft changes its direction gradually. Non-impulsive transfers relies on the low-thrust propulsion for the operation. Some of the mentionable low-thrust propulsion methods are, ionic propulsion, Hall-effect thruster and solar-sail systems. The electrostatic ion thruster uses high-voltage electrodes to accelerate ions with electrostatic forces, and achieve a specific impulse within the range of 4000-8000s.

Mathematical Models 
The continuous low-thrust relative transfer can be described in mathematical form by adding components of specific thrust which will act as control input in the equations of motion model for relative orbital transfer. Although a number of linearized models have been developed since 1960s which gives simplified set of equations, one popular model was developed by W. H. Clohessy and R. S. Wiltshire, and is modified to account for continuous motion and can be written as:

where:
  is the orbital frequency of the target orbit

Optimal relative transfers 
Since, in continuous low-thrust transfers the thrust availability is limited, such type of transfers are usually subjected to certain performance index and final state constraints, posing the transfer as an optimal control problem with defined boundary conditions. For the transfer to have optimal control input expenditure, the problem can be written as:

subjected to dynamics of the relative transfer:

and boundary conditions:

where:
  is the state-vector defined as 
  is the control input vector defined as 
  is the weight matrix
  is the state matrix obtained from the Clohessy-Wiltshire equations, such that, 
  is the input matrix, such that,  
 is the time of start of transfer
  is the time of end of transfer
  is the initial value of the state vector 
  is the final value of the state vector 
Sometimes, it is also useful to subject the system to control constraints because in case of continuous low-thrust transfer, there are always bounds on the availability of thrust.

Additionally, if the relative transfer is occurring such that the chaser and the target spacecraft are very close to each other, the collision-avoidance constraints can also be employed in the optimal control problem in the form of a minimum relative distance,  as:

 

See also 

Bi-elliptic transfer
Delta-v budget
Geostationary transfer orbit
Halo orbit
Lissajous orbit
List of orbits
Orbital mechanics

References

Astrodynamics
Orbital maneuvers